Alberto Pagani
  Nello Pagani
  Alessio Palumbo
  Mattia Pasini
  Renzo Pasolini
  Daniel Pedrosa
  Fabricio Perren
  Lukáš Pešek
  Bill Petch
   Roland Pike
  Paolo Pileri
  Michele Pirro
  Manuel Poggiali
  Patrick Pons
  Sito Pons
  Sebastián Porto
  Umberto Praga
  Tarquinio Provini
  Alberto Puig

 P